WBQC-LD (channel 25), branded on-air as WKRP Channel 25, is a low-power television station in Cincinnati, Ohio, United States. It is owned by Gray Television alongside Fox affiliate WXIX-TV (channel 19). WBQC-LD is affiliated with several digital multicast networks, including Cozi TV on its main channel. Its transmitter is located along Symmes Street, just south of East McMillan Street in Cincinnati (shared with ABC affiliate WCPO-TV, channel 9). 

According to its website, WBQC was the first television station to be fully automated. It was also the first station in Cincinnati to perform "digital spot insertion" and to air Spanish-language commercials.

History

WB affiliation
The station signed on the air in 1994, as low-power television station W25AI on UHF channel 25. The station originally ran mostly infomercials. All of Cincinnati's full-power stations, in contrast, carried programming from national networks. Needing an affiliate in Cincinnati, The WB, which launched on January 11, 1995, signed an affiliation agreement with channel 25. The station then changed its call letters to WBQC-LP to reflect its new affiliation and began to brand itself on-air as "WB Channel 25".

UPN affiliation
In July 1997, the Sinclair Broadcast Group signed an affiliation deal with The WB that resulted in a number of the company's UPN affiliates and independent stations switching to The WB. One of the stations included in the deal was WSTR-TV (channel 64). As a result, the WB affiliation moved to WSTR in January 1998, leaving WBQC without a network affiliation. UPN struck an affiliation deal to air its programming on NBC affiliate WLWT (channel 5), which aired its weekly then-Monday-to-Wednesday six-hour schedule from 2 to 4 a.m. on early Saturday, Sunday and Monday mornings as a secondary affiliation. Meanwhile, as an independent station, WBQC carried NBC programming that WLWT chose not to carry, including various sporting events, as well as series such as The Profiler and Sunset Beach. After a few months of poor late night ratings on WLWT, and with the addition of Thursday and Friday hours on the horizon the next season that would likely see WLWT refuse lower-rated programming and the network's Thursday night film, UPN resumed discussions with WBQC to join the network. In the fall of 1998, UPN agreed to affiliate with WBQC.

"Should-carry"
WBQC had been pushing for carriage on local cable and satellite providers for many years. In 2005, WBQC swapped channel allocations with America One-affiliated sister station WOTH-LP (channel 38). In 2001, WBQC became a Class A television station, with the call sign WBQC-CA, in hopes of receiving must-carry status on cable providers and protection from displacement by the full-power stations' digital channel allocations. As a Class A station, WBQC had to meet all the requirements of a full-power station. Ultimately, Class A stations did not receive must-carry status, though they did receive protection from displacement. In negotiating with the cable and satellite providers, WBQC claimed "should-carry" status, in the absence of federal must-carry recognition.

Several small satellite master antenna television (SMATV) systems and the Delhi Township cable system carried the small independent station. Meanwhile, talks with InterMedia Cable (Northern Kentucky), Time Warner Cable (Cincinnati), and Adelphia Cable (some suburbs) saw no progress for years. Shortly after WBQC became a UPN affiliate, however, a number of systems began offering WBQC on their lineups:

 DirecTV, Insight Communications (which purchased InterMedia), and Adelphia all added WBQC on channel 25.
 The city of Lebanon, Ohio, began competing with Time Warner with its own municipal cable service. Lebanon Cable, which has since been sold to Cincinnati Bell, carried WBQC on channel 17 (later channel 97).
 SusCom Cable (Indiana) added WBQC on channel 6.

Although Time Warner Cable had long included WBQC on its Oxford, Ohio system, on channel 13, the station remained off of Time Warner's Cincinnati offerings. According to WBQC, some Cincinnati customers were told by Time Warner representatives that the station operated out of Indianapolis, Indiana; Dayton, Ohio; or "some guy's basement". At one point, Time Warner considered carrying WSBK-TV from Boston rather than WBQC (it had used the same strategy to keep Syracuse, New York UPN affiliate WAWA-LP off their systems until an ownership change, though that was more because of WAWA's low-quality schedule surrounding UPN programming).

Once UPN acquired Buffy the Vampire Slayer, Time Warner Cable resumed discussions with WBQC. After months of talks, Time Warner agreed to carry WBQC. Unlike the other cable systems, Time Warner Cincinnati would only air WBQC nightly from 6 to 11 p.m. on channel 20, a leased access cable channel. Time Warner later purchased Adelphia, but kept WBQC on the latter's lineup until after Time Warner Cable had fully transitioned Adelphia viewers into the Time Warner system.

From the late 1990s until at least 2001, WBQC aired a rebroadcast of WCPO-TV (channel 9)'s 6:00 p.m. newscast at 7:00 p.m. Later, WBQC formed a joint broadcast venture with Fox affiliate WXIX-TV (channel 19), allowing WBQC to air that station's 10 p.m. newscast during sporting events, such as Cincinnati Bearcats basketball. WBQC would also air some basketball games produced by WXIX.

Independence
With the shutdown of UPN and The WB in September 2006 and replacement by The CW (which was initially composed primarily of programs from both predecessor networks), there was a question where the network's affiliation would land in Cincinnati. WSTR was the WB affiliate and a full-power station; WBQC was the UPN affiliate, a low-power Class A station with full cable carriage (except for Time Warner Cable's Cincinnati system). On March 2, 2006, it was announced that WSTR would affiliate with MyNetworkTV. This seemingly opened the door for WBQC to potentially become The CW's Cincinnati affiliate, however on April 19 it was confirmed that the network would be carried on digital subchannel 12.2 of Cincinnati's CBS affiliate WKRC-TV (channel 12). As a result of the shuffle, WBQC became an independent station upon the dissolution of UPN in September.

By July 4, 2006, in a stunt to promote its "Independence Day", UPN network programming was moved out of prime time, and was replaced with marathons, and then a schedule of older off-network dramas and comedies. UPN aired early Tuesday to Saturday mornings from 2 to 4 a.m. until its closure. The station then changed its logo, which had some elements of the Ohio state flag. The same year, WBQC moved from Golf Manor to its newly built studios in Roselawn.

With the launch of WKRC's "CinCW" digital subchannel, Time Warner Cable dropped WBQC on October 18 to carry WKRC-DT2 full-time on channel 20. The CinCW also replaced WBQC on channel 25 on both Insight Communications and DirecTV, which created some confusion to viewers who thought WBQC was the CinCW. Insight moved WBQC to digital cable channel 189. In 2007, Time Warner Cable Cincinnati experienced a change in management. Early the next year, WBQC and Time Warner Cable started discussions for cable carriage. However, Time Warner Cable stated it did not have any channels available, either on the analog or digital tier.

On November 28, 2008, the station adopted the branding "WKRP-TV", drawing on the 1970s CBS sitcom WKRP in Cincinnati. According to Elliott Block, general manager and chief engineer for the small station, the move was made to promote the station's move to digital broadcasting. Currently, the change reflects only the branding of the station, as its legal callsign remains WBQC-LD.

In November 2010, Cincinnati Bell's local fiber-optic service, FiOptics, began carrying all five of WBQC's subchannels on channels 254 and 270 to 273. In January 2011, WBQC replaced its primary subchannel with programming from the Retro Television Network.

Sale to Gray Television
On September 28, 2022, Gray Television announced its intent to purchase WBQC-LD for $2.5 million. The sale was completed on November 21, making WBQC-LD a sister station to WXIX-TV.

Programming
WBQC currently airs network programming. Until 2011, the station produced several local programs, including:
 New Xtreme Sounds – music entertainment
 Scizone with Bill Boshears – commentary on political and paranormal topics
 Friday Night Fu – campy kung fu movies hosted by Cap'n Dave and the Fu Crew
 After Midnight – music talent showcase
 On the Mark – call-in talk show hosted by Mark McDonald
 Sunday Mass

Subchannels
The station's digital signal is multiplexed:

Decades (20.2) and Quest (20.3) went live on the air on April 4, 2018.

References

External links
 Official website
 WBQC historical documents – formerly "The War"
  – overview of the station's history, including a glimpse of the WB25 logo, as well as promotions for local and network programming

BQC-LD
Gray Television
Cozi TV affiliates
This TV affiliates
GetTV affiliates
TheGrio affiliates
Start TV affiliates
Movies! affiliates
Decades (TV network) affiliates
Quest (American TV network) affiliates
Twist (TV network) affiliates
Television channels and stations established in 1988
1988 establishments in Ohio
Low-power television stations in the United States